The Home and Colonial Library was a series of works published in London from 1843 to 1849, comprising 49 titles, by John Murray III. He founded it, as a series of cheap reprints, original works and translations, slanted towards travel literature in the broad sense, in the year of death of his father, John Murray II.

Listing
This listing of 44 titles of the Library, two of those coming in 2 vols., was published in 1876.

Originally there were some extra titles, or works later substituted. Two books were often printed in one volume, and 49 works in all were in 37 volumes. Washington Irving's Bracebridge Hall, Traveller's Tales and Oliver Goldsmith were included. There were also the Memoirs of Sir Fowell Buxton. Melville's works Typee and Omoo were at first issued separately. Murray required that Typee appear as Four Months among the Natives of the Marquesas.

Notes

External links
 Home and Colonial Library (John Murray) - Book Series List - includes series description

Series of books
1840s books